The discography of Malaysian singer-songwriter Yuna consists of four international studio albums, three Malaysian albums, six EPs, 32 international single releases, and 43 music videos.

Yuna was eventually discovered in the US by the Indie-Pop record label and management company. They flew out to Malaysia to convince her to sign with them and then proceeded to get her a deal with Fader Label in February 2011. In the US, she released her first EP, Decorate, in March of the same year. On April 24, 2012, Yuna released her self-titled international debut album, Yuna, which peaked at number 19 on Billboard's Heatseekers Albums charts in the US. The lead single, "Live Your Life", produced by Grammy Award-winning artist Pharrell Williams, reached number 37 on Billboard'''s Heatseekers Songs charts. Her second international album, Nocturnal, was released in October 2013, preceded by the lead single, "Rescue".

In May 2016, her third album, Chapters, was released, featuring guest appearances from Usher and Jhené Aiko. Her breakout single from the album, "Crush" featuring Usher, peaked at number 3 on [[Adult R&B Songs|Billboard's Adult R&B]] charts in the US. As of December 2016, Chapters had been selected by Billboard in 7th place of its 2016 Critics' Picks for Best R&B Album, and was subsequently nominated in the Top 20 Best R&B Albums of 2016 by the Rolling Stone magazine. Yuna's latest album, Rouge'', was released in July 2019. She has also contributed to several soundtrack albums throughout her career.

Albums

Studio albums

International releases

Malaysian releases

Live albums

Remix albums

Extended plays

Singles

As lead artist

As featured artist

Promotional singles

Guest appearances

Music videos

Other songs

 "Cartoon Couple"
 "I'm Not Like You"
 "Hero"
 "Missing Star"
 "Lie to Me With Style"
 "This Is Ours" 
 "Peer Pressure"
 "Walking Like a Dream"
 "Mermaid"
 "Follow Me Follow Love"
 "Home"
 "Hold On, We're Going Home"

Cover songs

 Peterpan - "Ku Katakan Dengan Indah"
 Tan Sri P. Ramlee & Asiah Tuah - "Gelora Jiwa"
 Rokiah Wanda - "Bulan Ditutup Awan"
 Oh Chentaku - "Polaroid"
 Kanye West - "Paranoid"
 Taking Back Sunday - "New Again"
 Nirvana - "Come As You Are"
 The Beatles - "Here Comes the Sun"
 Incubus - "I Miss You"
 Frank Ocean - "Thinkin Bout You"
 M. Nasir - "Keroncong Untuk Ana"
 Foals- "Spanish Sahara"
 Brad Kane and Lea Salonga - "A Whole New World"
 Drake - "Hotline Bling"
 Justin Bieber - "What Do You Mean"
 The Cure - "Lovesong"
 Francoise Hardy - "Le Premier Bonheur Du Jour"
 Post Malone - "Better Now"

Malay songs

 "Cinta Sempurna"
 "Dan Sebenarnya"
 "Gadis Semasa"
 "Penakut"
 "Raya Oh Yeah"
 "KL Kita" (featuring Qi Razali)
 "Terukir Di Bintang"
 "Lelaki"
 "Lautan"
 "Dwihati" (with Aizat Amdan)
 "Pulang" (featuring SonaOne)

Notes

References

Discographies of Malaysian artists
Pop music discographies
Yuna (singer)